This is a list of regions of Australia that are not Australian states or territories. The most commonly known regionalisation is the governmental division of the state into regions for economic development purposes.

Others regionalisations include those made for purposes of land management, such as agriculture or conservation; information gathering, such as statistical or meteorological. Although most regionalisations were defined for specific purposes and give specific boundaries, many regions will have similar names and extents across different regionalisations. As a result, the names and boundaries of regions can vary and may overlap in popular places.

Not all the regions in this list have official status as an economic or administrative region.

Types of Australian regionalisation
A regionalisation of Australia is a system by which Australia is divided into regions. There are a great many different regionalisations, created for a range of purposes, including political, administrative, statistical and biological.

Political and administrative regionalisations

The most prominent regionalisation of Australia is the division into the various states and territories. For electoral purposes, the Australian Senate uses states and territories, but the Australian House of Representatives breaks the country into Divisions. Each state is similarly divided into electoral "regions", "districts" or "provinces", each of which elects members to the house or houses of the state's parliament. Finally, the country is divided into local government areas, each of which is administered by a council.

Other administrative regionalisations may exist within each state. For example, the whole of mainland Western Australia other than the Perth metropolitan area, is divided into regions for the purposes of administration of the Regional Development Commissions Act 1993.

Statistical regionalisations
For the purposes of statistical geography, the Australian Bureau of Statistics uses the Australian Standard Geographical Classification, a hierarchical regionalisation whose coarsest level is the states and territories, then statistical divisions, statistical subdivisions, statistical local areas, and finally, census collection districts.

Biogeographical regionalisations
Until recently, most biogeographical and phytogeographical regionalisations of Australia were individually defined for each state and territories; for example: Gwen Harden's botanical regionalisation of New South Wales; Orchard's "natural regions" regionalisation of Tasmania; and John Stanley Beard's division of Western Australia into Botanical Provinces and Botanical Districts.

More recently, two regionalisations that cover the entire country have been put in place. The World Wildlife Fund's regionalisation of the world into 825 terrestrial ecoregions created 40 ecoregions in Australia. Within Australia, however, the de facto standard regionalisation is now the Interim Biogeographic Regionalisation for Australia (IBRA). This divides Australia into 85 bioregions, which are further divided into 404 subregions.

Others
There are a range of other regionalisations of Australia, including:
 meteorological and climatic regionalisations, as defined and used by the Bureau of Meteorology;
 catchment areas and drainage systems;
 geological regionalisation

 cadastral divisions of Australia

Multi-state/territorial
 Capital CountryACT/NSW
 Eastern AustraliaNSW/QLD/VIC/ACT, sometimes including SA and TAS
 East Coast of Australiaalso known as an Eastern seaboard
 Lake Eyre basinQLD/SA/NT/NSW
 Murray–Darling basinNSW/ACT/VIC/QLD/SA
 Northern AustraliaNT/QLD/part of WA
 The NullarborSA/WA
 Outbackmainly NT and WA, but all territories except ACT and TAS
 Southern AustraliaTAS/VIC/SA, sometimes including NSW and WA
 Sunraysiaa portion of NSW and VIC

New South Wales

See also the Bureau of Meteorology's NSW regions map.

 Blue Mountains
 Central Coast
 Central Tablelands
 Central West
 Greater Western Sydney
 Far South Coast
 Far West
 Hunter Region (Newcastle)
 Illawarra (Wollongong)
 Lord Howe Island
 New England (north-west)
 Murray
 Mid North Coast
 North West Slopes
 Northern Rivers
 Northern Tablelands
 Orana
 Riverina
 Sapphire Coast
 Snowy Mountains
 South Coast
 Southern Highlands
 Southern Tablelands
  South West Slopes
 Sunraysia
 Sydney

Northern Territory

See also the Bureau of Meteorology's NT region map

 Arnhem Land
 Barkly Tableland
 Central Australia/Alice Springs Region/Red Centre
 Darwin Region
 Katherine Region
 Top End
 Victoria River

Queensland

See also the Bureau of Meteorology's Queensland region map

 Central Queensland
 Channel Country
 Capricorn Coast
 Darling Downs
 Granite Belt
 Maranoa
 Far North Queensland
 Torres Strait Islands
 Gulf Country
 North Queensland
 Whitsunday
 Townsville
 South East Queensland
 Brisbane
 Gold Coast
 Sunshine Coast
 West Moreton
 Wide Bay-Burnett
 South Burnett
 Central West Queensland
 South West Queensland
 Channel Country

South Australia

See also the Bureau of Meteorology's South Australia regions map

 Adelaide Plains
 Adelaide Hills/Mount Lofty Ranges
 Barossa Valley
 Eyre Peninsula
 Far North
 Fleurieu Peninsula
 Flinders Ranges
 Kangaroo Island
 Limestone Coast
 Mid North
 Clare Valley
 Murray Mallee
 Murraylands
 Riverland
 Yorke Peninsula
 Copper Triangle

Tasmania

See also the Bureau of Meteorology's Tasmania regions map

 Central Highlands
 Midlands
 West Coast
 Hobart

Victoria

See also the Bureau of Meteorology's Victoria regions map

Official
The six official regions of Victoria are:
 Barwon South West
 Barwon
 Great South Coast
 Gippsland
 Grampians
 Central Highlands
 Wimmera Southern Mallee
 Greater Melbourne
 Hume
 Goulburn
 Ovens Murray
 Loddon Mallee
 Loddon Campaspe
 Mallee

Unofficial
 Central Victoria
 Yarra Valley
Upper Yarra
The Bays
 Port Phillip
 Mornington Peninsula
 Bellarine Peninsula
 Western Port
 Goldfields
Spa Country
Central Coast
Bass Coast
Northern Country/North Central
Central Murray
Lower Goulburn
 Goulburn Valley
Southern Riverina
Upper Goulburn
Northeast
 Victorian Alps
Upper Murray
High Country
 Bogong High Plains
Gippsland
 East Gippsland
 West Gippsland
 South Gippsland
 Central Gippsland
 Gippsland Lakes
Central Gippsland Coast
East Gippsland Coast
Victorian Alps
 Western District
 Central Highlands/Tablelands
 Pyrenees
The Grampians
Goldfields
Spa Country
Southwest
The Otways
West Coast
Shipwreck Coast
Great Ocean Road
Surf Coast
Northwest
 The Mallee
 Sunraysia
 Millewa
The Wimmera

Western Australia

See also the Bureau of Meteorology's Western Australia regions map.

The Western Australian system of regions defined by the Government of Western Australia for purposes of economic development administration, which excludes the Perth metropolitan area, is a series of nine regions.

The nine defined regions are:

 Gascoyne
 Goldfields-Esperance
 Great Southern
 Kimberley
 Mid West
 Peel
 Pilbara
 South West
 Wheatbelt

See also
 Australian regional rivalries
 Interim Biogeographic Regionalisation for Australia
 Local government in Australia

References

External links
 MyRegion.gov.au – an Australian government website dedicated to providing information about the 55 regions of the nation
 RDA.gov.au – Regional Development Australia sets regional priorities and helps guide local development and policy

Regions